Kiss Me Quick! is a 1964 American film directed by Peter Perry. The film was originally titled Dr Breedlove or How I Learned to Stop Worrying and Love (or, more simply, Dr Breedlove) to exploit the title of Stanley Kubrick's Dr Strangelove. It was retitled to exploit Billy Wilder's Kiss Me, Stupid.

Plot
The plot involves an alien, Sterilox, from the "Buttless" galaxy, being sent to Earth in order to find the perfect woman who will be used to create a race of servants. Sterilox is teleported into the lab of a mad scientist by the name of Dr. Breedlove, who offers Sterilox a number of beautiful women to choose from. The movie includes a dance number where three of Breedlove's women gyrate to rock music.

Cast
 Frank A. Coe as Sterilox/Frankenstein Monster (as Fattie Beltbuckle)
 Max Gardens as Dr. Breedlove (as Manny Goodtime)
 Althea Currier as Gertie Tassle (as Althea)
 Natasha as Boobra
 Jackie De Witt as Kissme (as Jackie)
 Claudia Banks as Hotty Totty (as Claudiea)
 Bibi as Barebra
 Donna as Gigi String
 Pat Hall as Gina Catchafanni (as Pat V)
 Lucky as Lotta Cash

Notes

External links

 

1960s comedy horror films
1964 horror films
1964 films
American sexploitation films
1960s science fiction horror films
American comedy horror films
1964 comedy films
1960s English-language films
1960s American films